Radioactive describes something undergoing radioactive decay, the process by which an unstable atomic nucleus emits radiation.

Radioactive may also refer to:

Materials
Naturally occurring radioactive material
Nuclear pharmacy, the preparation of radioactive materials for nuclear medicine
Radioactive contamination
Radioactive waste

Entertainment
Radioactive (Yelawolf album), a 2011 album by rapper Yelawolf
"Radioactive" (Gene Simmons song), a song from the 1978 album Gene Simmons by Gene Simmons
Radio:Active the fourth album from British pop rock group McFly
"Radioactive" (The Firm song), a song from the 1985 album The Firm by the English supergroup The Firm
"Radioactive" (Imagine Dragons song), a 2012 song by Imagine Dragons
"Radioactive" (Kings of Leon song), a 2010 song by Kings of Leon
"Radioactive" (Marina and the Diamonds song), a 2011 song by Marina and the Diamonds
"Radioactive" (Rita Ora song), a 2013 song by Rita Ora
Radioactive Records, a record label
Radioactive FM 96, a radio station, which broadcasts from Karachi, Pakistan
Radioactive (film), a biographical film about Marie Curie

See also
 Radioactive Man (disambiguation)
 Radio Active (disambiguation)
 Radioactivity (disambiguation)

zh:辐射